Yo soy Gilda: amar es un milagro also known as Gilda: The Series (English title: I am Gilda: love is a miracle) is an upcoming Argentine biographical series based on the life of Argentinian singer Gilda. The series is produced by Habitacion 120, same producer who made the film Gilda, I do not regret this love.

The series was scheduled to be released in 2019; but it didn't happen. The series is based on the of life of Argentine singer Gilda, starring Brenda Asnicar in the lead role. The series is directed by Benjamin Avila, director of Clandestine Childhood (2012), a film that represented the Argentine singer for the Oscar awards and nominated for the Goya awards.

Synopsis 
Gilda, the popular Argentine singer of the 90s, who tragically died at 34 in a car accident on the cusp of her career. The series tells her arduous path to achieve her dreams and singing for everyone. To do this, she will travel a path that few people will cheer up

Cast 
 Brenda Asnicar as Gilda

Production

Development 
In 2018, it was reported that Netflix is developing a biographical series based on the life of Argentine singer Gilda.

References 

2020 Argentine television series debuts
Argentine drama television series
Biographical television series
Cultural depictions of pop musicians
Hispanic and Latino American television
Spanish-language Netflix original programming
Television series based on singers and musicians
Television series set in the 1980s
Television series set in the 1990s
Television shows set in Argentina
Upcoming Netflix original programming